The  was a network of 400 km of  narrow gauge light railway lines that operated in the Kiso Valley in Nagano Prefecture, Japan.

The railway was used to support the logging of cedar forests in the region. The Kiso Forest had historically been the possession of a local lord, but at the time of the Meiji Restoration had become the property of the Imperial family. In 1901, a railway was laid into the forests and was initially worked by hand or animals. The first  locomotives built by Baldwin Locomotive Works were introduced in 1907. Further locomotives were obtained from Baldwin, as well as a Shay locomotive that was transferred to the Alishan Forest Railway in Taiwan when that line opened. The railway was extensively rebuilt in 1920, with steel bridges and 24 tunnels.

The railway was abolished in stages between 1966 and 1976.

References 

2 ft 6 in gauge railways in Japan
Forest railways
Railway lines in Japan
Defunct railroads
Railway lines opened in 1901